The Handball Federation of Uzbekistan (HFU) is the administrative and controlling body for handball and beach handball in the Republic of Uzbekistan. Founded in 1991, HFU is a member of Asian Handball Federation (AHF) and the International Handball Federation (IHF).

National teams
 Uzbekistan men's national handball team
 Uzbekistan men's national junior handball team
 Uzbekistan women's national handball team

References

External links
 Uzbekistan at the IHF website.
 Uzbekistan at the EHF website.

Handball in Uzbekistan
Handball
Sports organizations established in 1991
1991 establishments in Uzbekistan
Handball governing bodies
Asian Handball Federation
National members of the International Handball Federation